Seule ce soir is an album by Canadian jazz singer Emilie-Claire Barlow. This is the first album on which she sings every song in French. It was released on October 16, 2012. At the 2013 Juno Awards, Seule ce soir won Vocal Jazz Album of the Year. It also won Album of the Year - Jazz Interpretation at the 2013 ADISQ Awards.

Track listing 
 Quand le soleil dit bonjour aux montagnes
 Petit matin
 Chez moi
 Des croissants de soleil
 C'est si bon
 Ces bottes sont faites pour marcher
 La plus belle pour aller danser
 La belle dame sans regret
 T'es pas un autre
 Jardin d'hiver
 Seule ce soir
 Les yeux ouverts
 Comme je crie, comme je chante (with Julie Lamontagne)
 C'est merveilleux

References

External links
 Juno-nommed jazz singer Emilie-Claire Barlow jokes of Susan Lucci comparisons
 "Cinq à Six in the Summer: Emilie-Claire Barlow". CBC Radio, 24 August 2013
 "(Québec) On la savait francophile et très attachée au Québec, qui le lui rend bien, d'ailleurs...". Bouchard, Geneviève. Le Soleil, 20 October 2012.
 "JUNO-nominated jazz musicians Elizabeth Shepherd and Emilie-Claire Barlow move outside their comfort zones", City TV, 4 March 2013.

2012 albums
Emilie-Claire Barlow albums
Covers albums
Juno Award for Vocal Jazz Album of the Year albums